is a former Japanese football player.

Playing career

Japan
Matsushita attended Shizuoka Gakuen High School, with whom he won the All Japan High school Championship and Best 11 award in 2002, and began his career with Júbilo Iwata, playing for the team's U-18, U-19, and U-23 teams. After a loan spell with Ehime FC in 2006, he moved clubs in 2007, and was the key outside player for Ehime for three seasons.

United States
Matsushita decided to move abroad in 2011 and entered the open trial for Atlanta Silverbacks in the North American Soccer League. He became the first Japanese player ever to sign with the club and made his debut for his new team on April 16, 2011 in a game against FC Edmonton. Atlanta announced on November 8, 2011 that Matsushita would return for the 2012 season.

Playing style
Has been mainly playing on the left flank known for his accurate pinpoint crosses. Names former Brazilian National Team Player Cafu as his idol player.

Club statistics

References

External links

1985 births
Living people
Association football people from Ishikawa Prefecture
Japanese footballers
J1 League players
J2 League players
North American Soccer League players
Júbilo Iwata players
Ehime FC players
Atlanta Silverbacks players
Japanese expatriate footballers
Expatriate soccer players in the United States
Association football defenders